The Sarcosomataceae are a family of fungi in the order Pezizales. According to a 2008 estimate, the family contains 10 genera and 57 species. Most species are found in temperate areas, and are typically saprobic on rotten or buried wood.

References

Pezizales
Ascomycota families